Pierre A. J. Huylebroeck (13 October 1922 – 16 March 1989) was a Belgian speed skater. He competed at the 1948 Winter Olympics, the 1952 Winter Olympics and the 1956 Winter Olympics.

References

External links
  

1922 births
1989 deaths
Belgian male speed skaters
Olympic speed skaters of Belgium
Speed skaters at the 1948 Winter Olympics
Speed skaters at the 1952 Winter Olympics
Speed skaters at the 1956 Winter Olympics
Sportspeople from Brussels